Breach 2 is a science fiction strategy video game developed by Omnitrend Software in 1990 for the Amiga, Atari ST and MS-DOS. It is the sequel to the 1987 game Breach, and was itself followed by Breach 3 in 1995. The game is set in the universe of Omnitrend's Universe and Rules of Engagement, and is compatible with both Rules of Engagement games.

In 1991, an updated version titled Breach 2 Enhanced was released for the Amiga. This version contains new graphics and a level editor.

Story
The player is a squad leader in the interstellar Federated Worlds Special Forces, whose goal is to utilize his squad of space marines effectively in winning different scenarios. If the squad leader is killed, the player loses the scenario and is bumped out of the mission back to the main menu. The player controls every action of each marine, including the squad leader.

Gameplay
The game features some gameplay-system improvements over the original Breach, such as of all allowing diagonal movement and setting a path (instead of moving the units step-by-step), as well as improved visuals and sound. Additions include new weapons-of-war (such as smoke grenades, neutron bombs, camouflage suits, proximity charges and foxhole-makers) and enemies.

It also features a diagonally looking graphic tile set in a classic 2d space. The graphics makes it difficult to understand what actions can be performed. The fake isomerical view was dropped in the subsequent installment of the game Breach 3.

Reception
Computer Gaming World in 1990 described the game as more of an updated version of the first Breach than a true sequel, but with welcome improvements such as diagonal movement and end of permanent death. It concluded that those who enjoyed the original would welcome the new game. In a 1992 survey of science fiction games the magazine gave the title four stars out of five, stating that it was "Easy to learn and fun to play" with the scenario editor and downloadable scenarios making it a "continuing 'fresh' product", and a 1994 survey of strategic space games set in the year 2000 and later gave the game three stars. The game received 4 out of 5 stars (PC) and 4½ stars (Amiga) in Dragon.

Reviews
The Games Machine - Sep, 1990
ACE (Advanced Computer Entertainment) - Sep, 1990
Computer Gaming World - Nov, 1992
Atari ST User - Sep, 1990
Amiga Power - May, 1991
ASM (Aktueller Software Markt) - Jan, 1990
Strategy Plus

References

External links
Breach 2 at MobyGames
Breach 2 at GameSpot
Breach 2 at GameFAQs
Review in Info

1990 video games
Amiga games
Atari ST games
DOS games
Impressions Games games
Role-playing video games
Science fiction video games
Single-player video games
Strategy video games
Tactical role-playing video games
Turn-based tactics video games
Video games developed in the United States